The Cañariaco Norte mine is a single, contiguous, open-pit mineable copper deposit located in the north-western part of Peru in Ferreñafe Province. Cañariaco Norte is wholly owned by Candente Copper Corp. and represents one of the largest copper reserves in Peru and in the world having estimated Measured and Indicated Resources of 752.4 million tonnes grading 0.45% copper containing 7.533 billion pounds of copper and Inferred Resources of 157.7 million tonnes grading 0.41% copper containing 1.434 billion pounds of copper reserves of 910 million tonnes of ore grading 0.45% copper.

See also 
List of mines in Peru

Zinc mining

References 

Copper mines in Peru